The European Tour Destinations Senior Classic is a men's senior (over 50) professional golf tournament on the European Senior Tour.

It was held for the first time in June 2017 at Linna Golf near Hämeenlinna, Finland. It was the first European Senior Tour event held in Finland. Linna Golf previously hosted the SK Golf Challenge on the 2009 Challenge Tour.

The second event was held at the Lighthouse Golf & Spa Resort in Balchik, Bulgaria in September 2018. The 2019 event was played at PGA Catalunya Resort near Girona, Spain from 12 to 14 July.

Winners

References

External links
Coverage on the European Senior Tour's official site

European Senior Tour events
Golf tournaments in Finland
Golf tournaments in Bulgaria
Golf tournaments in Spain
Recurring sporting events established in 2017
2017 establishments in Finland